"Israel" is a ballad track written by Barry Gibb. It appeared on the Bee Gees' 1971 album, Trafalgar.

It was recorded on 7 April 1971 at the IBC Studios in London, along with the two Maurice Gibb compositions, "Trafalgar" and "It's Just the Way", the Robin Gibb composition "Engines, Aeroplanes", and another Barry Gibb composition, the ballad "Don't Wanna Live Inside Myself".

"Israel" was released as a single in May 1972 in Belgium, in the  Netherlands, where it reached No. 22, and in New Zealand. "Dearest" was chosen as the B-side.

While the exact meaning of the song is unknown, Seth Rogovoy interpreted it for The Forward as a "love song to Israel", noting that Gibb played it onstage during a trip to Israel in 1972.

Personnel
Barry Gibb — lead and backing vocals, acoustic guitar
Maurice Gibb — piano, bass and acoustic guitar
Geoff Bridgford — drums
Bill Shepherd — orchestral arrangement

References

Bee Gees songs
1971 songs
Songs written by Barry Gibb
Song recordings produced by Robert Stigwood
Song recordings produced by Barry Gibb
Song recordings produced by Robin Gibb
Song recordings produced by Maurice Gibb
1972 singles
1970s ballads